Washington Township is one of the sixteen townships of Morrow County, Ohio, United States.  The 2010 census found 1,300 people in the township.

Geography
Located in the northwestern corner of the county, it borders the following townships:
Polk Township, Crawford County - north
North Bloomfield Township - east
Congress Township - southeast
Gilead Township - south
Canaan Township - southwest
Tully Township, Marion County - west
Whetstone Township, Crawford County - northwest

No municipalities are located in Washington Township, although the unincorporated community of Iberia lies in the western part of the township and the locale of Surprise can still be identified in the southeast corner of section 10.

Name and history
Washington Township was organized in 1824. It is one of forty-three Washington Townships statewide.

Government
The township is governed by a three-member board of trustees, who are elected in November of odd-numbered years to a four-year term beginning on the following January 1. Two are elected in the year after the presidential election and one is elected in the year before it. There is also an elected township fiscal officer, who serves a four-year term beginning on April 1 of the year after the election, which is held in November of the year before the presidential election. Vacancies in the fiscal officership or on the board of trustees are filled by the remaining trustees.

References

External links
County website

Townships in Morrow County, Ohio
Townships in Ohio
1824 establishments in Ohio
Populated places established in 1824